Robert McAlinden (born 22 May 1946) is an English former professional footballer who played as a winger in England, Northern Ireland, South Africa and the United States, making over 100 career appearances.

Career
McAlinden was born in Salford to Irish parents. Between the age of 13 and 15 he played for Salford Boys. After interest from a number of League clubs, he joined Aston Villa, but homesickness meant he soon returned. A successful trial at Manchester City followed. At City, McAlinden was in the same youth team as Mike Doyle and Glyn Pardoe. His sole Manchester City appearance came in a 3–2 defeat in the Football League to Preston North End in October 1963, at a time when the Manchester City squad was severely depleted by injury. McAlinden was released by Manchester City at the end of the 1964–65 season, upon the expiry of his contract. He then spent the summer in North America at the invitation of Roy Gratrix. While in North America McAlinden met Stanley Matthews, who offered him a contract at Port Vale. McAlinden joined the club, but did not progress beyond the reserve team.

From Port Vale, McAlinden joined Belfast club Glentoran. During the week McAlinden trained at Stockport County, and flew to Belfast on Fridays to play at the weekend. At Glentoran, McAlinden was part of the team that won the Irish Cup in 1966. At the end of the season, he joined South African team Durban City. His stay in South Africa was brief, and upon his return to England he quit playing and became a roofer. Five years later he returned to the game part-time with Stalybridge Celtic.

McAlinden was friends with George Best through a mutual interest in gambling. When Best joined the Los Angeles Aztecs of the North American Soccer League in 1975, he recommended McAlinden to Aztecs manager John Chaffetz. McAlinden joined Best at the club in time for the 1976 season; the pair also shared a house. Given a second chance for a career in the sport, McAlinden played for the Aztecs for three years. Off the field, McAlinden, Best and three others bought a bar in Los Angeles. McAlinden eventually bought the others out, and owned the bar for 20 years. McAlinden was also best man when Best married his first wife Angie Janes in 1978.

When Rinus Michels became Aztecs coach in 1978, McAlinden found himself out of favour. He was traded to the Memphis Rogues, where his former Aztecs teammate Charlie Cooke was the coach. McAlinden also played for Bournemouth, and the San Jose Earthquakes.

Career statistics
Source:

References

1946 births
Living people
English footballers
Association football wingers
Aston Villa F.C. players
Manchester City F.C. players
AFC Bournemouth players
Port Vale F.C. players
Glentoran F.C. players
English expatriate footballers
Expatriate soccer players in South Africa
Expatriate soccer players in the United States
Expatriate association footballers in Northern Ireland
English expatriate sportspeople in the United States
English expatriate sportspeople in South Africa
Los Angeles Aztecs players
Memphis Rogues players
San Jose Earthquakes (1974–1988) players
English Football League players
North American Soccer League (1968–1984) indoor players
North American Soccer League (1968–1984) players
Stalybridge Celtic F.C. players